Pilatoporus is a genus of fungi in the family Fomitopsidaceae.

References

Fomitopsidaceae
Polyporales genera
Taxa described in 1990